The Beggar Student is a 1927 German silent film directed by Jacob Fleck and Luise Fleck and starring Harry Liedtke, Ida Wüst and Agnes Esterhazy. It is an adaptation of Carl Millöcker's operetta The Beggar Student.

The film's art direction was by Botho Hoefer and Hans Minzloff.

Cast

References

Bibliography

External links

1927 films
Films of the Weimar Republic
Films directed by Jacob Fleck
Films directed by Luise Fleck
German silent feature films
Films set in Poland
Films set in the 1700s
Films based on operettas
1920s historical films
German historical films
German black-and-white films
1920s German films